The Herald Sun is a conservative daily tabloid newspaper based in Melbourne, Australia, published by The Herald and Weekly Times, a subsidiary of News Corp Australia, itself a subsidiary of the Murdoch owned News Corp. The Herald Sun primarily serves Melbourne and the state of Victoria and shares many articles with other News Corporation daily newspapers, especially those from Australia.

It is also available for purchase in Tasmania, the Australian Capital Territory and border regions of South Australia and southern New South Wales such as the Riverina and New South Wales South Coast, and is available digitally through its website and apps. In 2017, the paper had a daily circulation of 350,000 from Monday to Friday.

The Herald Sun newspaper is the product of a merger in 1990 of two newspapers owned by The Herald and Weekly Times Limited: the morning tabloid paper The Sun News-Pictorial and the afternoon broadsheet paper The Herald. It was first published on 8 October 1990 as the Herald-Sun.

History

The Herald

The Herald was founded on 3 January 1840 by George Cavenagh as the Port Phillip Herald. In 1849, it became The Melbourne Morning Herald. At the beginning of 1855, it became The Melbourne Herald before settling on The Herald from 8 September 1855 - the name it would hold for the next 135 years. From 1869, it was an evening newspaper. Colonel William Thomas Reay was sometime literary editor and later associate editor, before becoming managing editor in 1904. When The Argus newspaper closed in 1957, The Herald and Weekly Times bought out and continued various Argus media assets. In 1986, The Herald's Saturday edition, The Weekend Herald (which had adopted a tabloid format, in order to distinguish it from the Monday to Friday editions' broadsheet format) was closed.

The Sun News-Pictorial
The Sun News-Pictorial was founded on 11 September 1922, and bought by The Herald and Weekly Times in 1925.

Merger to form the Herald-Sun
In its prime, The Herald had a circulation of almost 600,000, but by the time of its 150th anniversary in 1990, with the impact of evening television news and a higher proportion of people using cars to get home from work rather than public transport, The Herald's circulation had fallen below 200,000. This was much less than that of the morning Sun.

With the only alternative option being to close The Herald, The Herald and Weekly Times decided to merge the two newspapers. The Herald was published for the last time as a separate newspaper on 5 October 1990. The next day, The Sun News-Pictorial published its last edition. The Sunday editions of the two newspapers, the Sunday Herald and the Sunday Sun, were also merged to form the Sunday Herald Sun. The resulting newspaper had both the size and style of The Sun News-Pictorial. Bruce Baskett, the last Editor of The Herald, was the first Editor of the Herald-Sun.

The hyphen in its title was dropped after 1 May 1993 as part of an effort to drop the overt reminder of the paper's two predecessors that the hyphen implied, and also by the fact that by 1993, most of the columns and features inherited from The Herald and The Sun News-Pictorial had either been discontinued or subsumed completely in new sections.

After a progressive decline in circulation the afternoon edition was cancelled, the last edition being published on 21 December 2001. The News Corp Australia-produced mX had filled part of that gap, being freely distributed of an afternoon from stands throughout the Melbourne CBD until 12 June 2015, though generally not available outside that area.

Recent editors include Peter Blunden, Simon Pristel, Phil Gardner and Bruce Guthrie.

Circulation
In 2017, the Herald Sun was the highest-circulating daily newspaper in Australia, with a weekday circulation of 350 thousand and claimed readership of 1.26 million.

According to third-party web analytics providers Alexa and SimilarWeb, Herald Sun's website is the 74th and 125th most visited in Australia respectively, as of August 2015. In 2015, SimilarWeb rated the site as the 15th most visited news website in Australia, attracting almost 6.6 million visitors per month.

Ethics and coverage controversies

LGBTI people and issues 

On 9 June 2021, Sydney University researcher Dr Alexandra Garcia published a corpus linguistics analysis of reporting about LGBTI Australians by the Herald Sun and affiliated Newscorp mastheads the Daily Telegraph and The Australian. Following an analysis of more than one million published words, Dr Garcia concluded that the Herald Sun and its associated publications covered transgender people and issues substantially more than any other organization, and the coverage was found to be overwhelmingly negative, with more than 90% of articles representing transgender Australians in a strongly negative light. The research found that the publication of Advisory Guidelines by the Australian Press Council had not improved the standard of reporting, with most reports and columns being characterised by fear-mongering, misrepresentation of medical science, divisive rhetoric, derogatory language, and suppression and under-representation of the voice of transgender people.

The analysis followed similar work by LGBTI rights watchdog, Rainbow Rights Watch, in 2017, which analysed more than 8 million published words which found that reporting in Australian press publications Daily Telegraph, Herald Sun, and The Australian were calculated to inflame fear, uncertainty, and confusion about transgender people and issues, and that the Australian Press Council was ineffectual at upholding long term balance and good media ethics. 

On 21 January 2021, the Herald Sun published a factual report by journalist Serena Seyfort concerning a woman accused of detonating a molotov cocktail in a Melbourne suburb. The article included prominent and repeated references to the transgender status of the accused in the sub-headline and throughout the body of the article, also describing the woman using her former name without any obvious public interest justification. On 21 July, 2021, the Australian Press Council concluded that the article breached media ethics standards, saying "publishers should exercise great care not to place unwarranted emphasis on characteristics such as race, religion, nationality, country of origin, gender, sexual orientation, marital status, disability, illness or age".

Other controversies

Australian Greens policy on drugs
Shortly before the 2004 election, the Herald Sun published an article entitled "Greens back illegal drugs" (Herald Sun, 31 August 2004) written by Gerard McManus which made a number of claims about the Australian Greens based on their harm minimisation and decriminalisation policies posted on their website at the time. The Greens complained to the Australian Press Council. The text of their adjudication reads:

In the context of an approaching election, the potential damage was considerable. The actual electoral impact cannot be known but readers were seriously misled. [...] The claims made in the original article were seriously inaccurate and breached the Council's guiding principles of checking the accuracy of what is reported, taking prompt measures to counter the effects of harmfully inaccurate reporting, ensuring that the facts are not distorted, and being fair and balanced in reports on matters of public concern.

Contempt of court for source protection
In June 2007, two Herald Sun journalists, Michael Harvey and Gerard McManus, were found guilty in the Victorian County Court of contempt of court after refusing to disclose the source of a story the pair wrote in the Herald Sun on Australian Government plans to scale back proposed veterans entitlements. The controversy resulted in agitation to change the law to introduce "shield laws" in Australia to take into consideration the journalists' code of ethics.

Cartoon of Serena Williams
Following Serena Williams' claim of sexist behaviour by umpire Carlos Ramos at the 2018 U.S. Open women's final, the Herald Sun's cartoonist Mark Knight drew an illustration of the match which was described as sexist and racist. In the cartoon, Williams is shown to have smashed her racket whilst a baby's dummy lays on the floor. Knight's illustration has been compared by some, including the political cartoonist and Washington Post columnist Michael Cavna, to illustrations popular during the Jim Crow era in the United States. Knight is also accused of making Williams' Japanese opponent, Naomi Osaka, appear as a "white woman". Following this, there was significant condemnation of both the Herald Sun and Knight for the use of this image by the author J. K. Rowling and Jesse Jackson amongst others. The Herald Sun defended its decision to publish the cartoon and two days after its initial publication, the cartoon was reprinted in part along with a series of other illustrations by Knight on its front page under the caption "WELCOME TO PC WORLD."

Depiction of the Australian Broadcasting Corporation 
Herald Sun columnist Andrew Bolt published an opinion piece titled 'ABC a propaganda vehicle on public dime' in response to ABC's most recent Four Corners report. The report argues that Rupert Murdoch's US-based media corporation Fox News is former President Donald Trump's "most reliable echo chamber - that is a propaganda vehicle to destabilise democracy." In response, Bolt contended that the ABC itself is a propaganda vehicle, operating with tax-payers' money. He therefore believes the ABC is in breach of the relevant law, the ABC Act of 1983. The Act requires impartiality in the ABC's reporting; in contrast, Bolt believes the ABC to be an echo-chamber for Australia's left-wing party, (the Australian Labor Party, a centre-left party), thus regarding the report as an example of the hypocrisy of the broadcaster.

Collectible items
Over the years, the Herald Sun has had a range of magazines, pins and memorabilia (usually with an outside partner) that could be obtained by either getting it out of the newspaper, or using a token from the newspaper to collect or purchase the item. Items that have been a part of this scheme include:

 William Ellis Green ("WEG") official VFL/AFL Premiership posters (1966–2008; his death); the tradition is continued by Herald Sun cartoonist Mark Knight (2009–)
 The 2000 Olympic Torch Relay Pin – the collection includes 15 place pins and one State Pin of Victoria (2000)
 Australian Football League trading cards – every year, near the start of the AFL season (2004–present)
 The Simpsons pins (2006)
 Socceroos medallions (2006)
 Celebrate 50 Years of TV (2006) – in conjunction with Nine Network
 The Ashes series pins (2006)
 Family Encyclopedia CD-ROM Collection (2006) – in conjunction with publishing company Dorling Kindersley
 The Greatest (2007) – a 14-part magazine series   
 Amazing Pictures (2007) – a 4-part magazine series
 Discovery Atlas DVD Collection (2009)
 Harry Potter: The Ultimate Collection (2011)

See also
List of newspapers in Australia
3DB – formerly co-owned with The Herald and The Sun News-Pictorial
HSV-7 – formerly co-owned with The Herald and The Sun News-Pictorial
Herald Sun Player of the Year

References

External links

The Port Phillip Herald and The Herald archive, 1840-1902
Media Watch segment aired 1 May 2006, ABC. "Age vs. Hun: Off-field Biff". Video accessed online 6 June 2006.

1990 establishments in Australia
News Corp Australia
Newspapers published in Melbourne
Publications established in 1990
Daily newspapers published in Australia